River Colne is the name of several rivers in England

 River Colne, Essex, passing through Halstead, Colchester and Wivenhoe
 River Colne, Hertfordshire, a tributary of the River Thames, flowing from south Hertfordshire to form the border of Buckinghamshire and Greater London
 River Colne, West Yorkshire, a tributary of the River Calder passing through Huddersfield
 Colne Water, in Colne, Lancashire

See also
Colne, a town in Lancashire
 Colne Brook, one of several distributaries of the River Colne in Hertfordshire
 River Coln in Gloucestershire